Temporal is the second album by the Spanish band Radio Tarifa, released internationally in 1997. The band supported the album with a North American tour.

Production
The album was produced by Fain Dueñas and Vincent Molino; Dueñas was also the musical director. Temporal incorporates more flamenco elements into the band's sound. Radio Tarifa used such instruments as the darbuka, oud, crumhorn, and ney. Studio musicians backed Radio Tarifa's three main members.

"El Mandil de Carolina" is a traditional Castilian and Galician composition.

Critical reception

The Washington Post wrote that "as is demonstrated by such pieces as the flamenco 'Solea' or 'Conductus', a 12th-century processional, Radio Tarifa also moves assuredly from the cafe to the cathedral." The Guardian determined that "it's postmodern early music, for want of a funkier phrase, poised, surprising, inspiring, throbbing with percussion and sweeping the listener with Arabic instrumentation and Andalucian voices."

Guitar Player concluded that "scholars and romantics alike will be seduced by their soulful vocals, explosive percussion, and superb fretwork." The Globe and Mail deemed Temporal "a wonderful combination of Mediterranean styles." The St. Paul Pioneer Press called it "a dizzy, danceable stew of Afro-Latin rhythms."

AllMusic noted that "the ensemble concentrates on traditional material from Iberia, with pieces culled from Galician, Andalucian, Castilian, and Flamenco culture."

Track listing

References

1997 albums
Nonesuch Records albums